Hush is the second single album by South Korean girl group Everglow. The album was released digitally and physically on August 19, 2019.

Background and release
On August 4, it was revealed that Everglow would have their first comeback on August 19 with a second single album entitled Hush.

Concept images were released from August 6 to August 8. The tracklist was released on August 11, revealing three tracks: "Hush", title track "Adios", and "You Don't Know Me".

The music video teaser was released on August 14 and the full music video was released on August 19 altogether with the single release.

Promotion
Everglow held a live showcase on August 19, where they performed "Adios" and "You Don't Know Me".

The group began promoting their title track, "Adios", on August 22. They first performed the lead single on Mnet's M Countdown, followed by performances on KBS' Music Bank, MBC's Show! Music Core and SBS' Inkigayo.
 
On September 24, 2019, Everglow won their first music program broadcast award on The Show.

Commercial performance
Hush debuted at number five on the Gaon Album Chart. The songs "Adios", "Hush" and "You Don't Know Me" debuted at number 2, number 8 and respectively at number 10 on the Billboard World Digital Songs.

Track listing

Charts

Accolades

Music program wins

Release history

References

2019 singles
Everglow albums
Korean-language albums
Single albums